Taking Back The Night Life is the second full-length album by the Canadian metalcore band Liferuiner and also their first album on Uprising Records.
In early April 2008, the pre-production demo tracks of the entire album were released on multiple P2P clients. The band stated in an April 19 blog that this leaked version was not the complete album and they had yet to mix, master, and rearrange some of the tracks.  The band did however release the first single "MegaDEATH" on April 29 and noted that it was in fact a final, album version.

Track listing
 "A Ticket to the Pussy Crusher" - 1:01
 "Doug Burns to Death" - 2:09
 "You Look Better When You're Drunk" - 3:11
 "You Use Dirt as a Metaphor for Life" - 2:19
 "Megadeath" - 3:04
 "Americant" - 3:39
 "Ham Hands Lives" - 2:59
 "Taking Back the Night Life" - 2:55
 "Bad Rock Anthem" - 2:22
 "Amaranthine" - 2:16
 "Chernobyll" - 14:39 (The song "Chernobyll" lasts until 1:48. Between 1:48 and 11:50, there is silence, then the hidden track "xSMDx" plays.)

Personnel
Liferuiner
Jonny O'Callaghan - Vocals
Andrew McColl - Guitar/Bass
Sebastian Lueth - Guitar
Shane Tyrer - Drums
Production
Produced by Jamie King
Composer: Billy Jack HardCore (on tracks: 3, 5, 11) in West Hollywood, CA

References

https://myspace.com/therealliferuiner
https://myspace.com/riteofpassagerecords/

2008 albums
Liferuiner albums
Albums produced by Jamie King